Back in Business is the sixteenth and final studio album by American singer Eartha Kitt, released on November 23, 1994 by DRG Records. At the 38th Annual Grammy Awards in 1996, the album was nominated for Best Traditional Pop Vocal Performance.

Critical reception 

JT Griffith from AllMusic awarded Back in Business three out of five stars, calling it a "solid collection" that fulfilled Kitt's desire to return to the industry.

Track listing

References 

1994 albums
Eartha Kitt albums